Mane Mane Kathe is a 1981 Indian Kannada-language film, directed by Rajachandra and produced by B. S. Dwarakish and H. R. Prabhakar Reddy. The film stars Vishnuvardhan, Jayachitra, Srinivasa Murthy and K. Vijaya. The film has musical score by Chellapilla Satyam. The movie is a remake of the Telugu movie Ramayanamlo Pidakala Veta.

Cast

Vishnuvardhan
Jayachitra
Srinivasa Murthy
K. Vijaya
Lokanath
Leelavathi
Dubbing Janaki as Janaki
Dwarakish
Seetharam
Uma Shivakumar
BV Bhaskar

Soundtrack
The music was composed by Satyam.

References

External links
 

1981 films
1980s Kannada-language films
Films scored by Satyam (composer)
Kannada remakes of Telugu films
Indian drama films
Films directed by Rajachandra